The 20th century is a cocktail created in 1937 by a British bartender named C.A. Tuck, and named in honor of the celebrated 20th Century Limited train which ran between New York City and Chicago from 1902 until 1967.  The recipe was first published in 1937 in the Café Royal Cocktail Book by William J Tarling, President of the United Kingdom Bartenders' Guild and head bartender at the Café Royal.

Recipe

Ingredients

1 ounces (1/3 gill, 4.5 cl) gin
3/4 ounce (1/6 gill, 2 cl) Kina Lillet 
1/2 (or less, depending on taste) ounce (1/8 gill, 1.5 cl) light creme de cacao
3/4 ounce (1/6 gill, 2 cl) fresh lemon juice

Procedure

Shake in an iced cocktail shaker, and strain into a cocktail glass. Garnish with a lemon twist.

See also

 List of cocktails
 List of cocktails (alphabetical)
 List of IBA official cocktails

References

External links 
 The Café Royal Cocktail Book

Cocktails with gin
1937 introductions